
Gmina Jedlińsk is a rural gmina (administrative district) in Radom County, Masovian Voivodeship, in east-central Poland.

Villages
Gmina Jedlińsk contains the villages and settlements of Bierwce, Bierwiecka Wola, Boża Wola, Bród, Budki Wierzchowskie, Czarna Rola, Czarny Ług, Godzisz, Górna Wola, Gryzów, Gutów, Janki, Jankowice, Jedlanka, Jedlińsk, Jeziorno, Józefów, Józefówek, Kamińsk, Kępiny, Klwatka Szlachecka, Klwaty, Kruszyna, Lisów, Ludwików, Marcelów, Moczydło, Mokrosęk, Narty, Nowa Wola, Nowe Zawady, Obózek, Piaseczno, Piaski, Piastów, Płasków, Romanów, Stare Zawady, Urbanów, Wielogóra, Wierzchowiny, Wola Gutowska and Wsola.

Neighbouring gminas
Gmina Jedlińsk is bordered by the gminas of Głowaczów, Jastrzębia, Stara Błotnica, Stromiec and Zakrzew.

References
Polish official population figures 2006

Jedlinsk
Radom County